Jonathan Alan Beukes born 15 March 1979, Kimberley, Cape Province, South Africa is a South African cricket player who has played for the cricket teams of Free State, Eagles, South West Districts and Scotland.

External links
Cricket Online Profile

1979 births
Living people
Cricketers from Kimberley, Northern Cape
South African cricketers
Scotland cricketers
Free State cricketers
Knights cricketers